Project Fortress is a photovoltaic power station under construction in the UK.  It is sited on the Graveney marshes between Faversham and Whitstable, Kent in the UK. It will generate 350MW of electricity from  vertical solar panels and will feature 700MWh of battery storage. Because of its size, it is a nationally significant infrastructure project so outside the standard local planning procedure.

Description
The solar farm was developed in partnership by Hive Energy and Wirsol Energy Ltd and was originally named Cleve Hill Solar Farm. It was acquired by Quinbrook Infrastructure Partners in October 2021 and renamed Project Fortress.  Once operational, it will be the largest solar farm in the UK, generating 350 MW of electricity. The  of Grade 3b agricultural land will be covered by the east|west facing solar photovoltaic panels. 

Across the marsh run the 400kV powerlines of the national grid. They are supported by eight 40m pylons. There is a large 150/400kV electricity substation at Cleve Hill, serving the London Array offshore wind farm that lies to the north beyond the mouth of the Thames Estuary. The output from the Solar Farm will use this substation to connect to the grid. Here, a battery array will be placed, that will charge from the sunlight during the day and release the energy at night when it is needed.

Construction faced opposition by residents and environmental groups on the grounds of loss of biodiversity resulting from covering large areas with PV panels, and safety, where concerns were raised about a possible fire and explosion of the battery blocks.

Gallery

See also
Lithium battery
Solar power in the United Kingdom
Viking Link cable

References

External links
Official site

Solar power in the United Kingdom
Kent
Electric power infrastructure in England
Nationally Significant Infrastructure Projects (United Kingdom)